was a Japanese sumo wrestler from Yanagawa, Chikugo Province. He was the sport's 10th yokozuna. Although the name of the style of the yokozuna 's in-ring ceremony is named after him, the fact that he himself practiced this style is highly debated.

Early life and career
He lost his parents and grandmother in 1833 and had to work to help his three younger siblings. In 1841, a group from Edo-sumo, led by Oitekaze (an active ōzeki who was also a stablemaster), made a tour in Kyūshū to distract people after a period of famine. They went around and spotted the young man during an amateur tournament. Kyūkichi was reluctant to step into the ring, but Oitekaze was stunned by his ability to easily take over his opponents. He made his debut in by joining the Jinmaku stable in Osaka-sumo in the summer of 1845. He later after moved to Edo in 1847, after being recruited by Edo-sumo ōzeki Oitekaze Kitaro. There, he wrestled for the Yanagawa Domain and was promoted to the top makuuchi division in February 1852. He was a very good fighter, but at that time, the position in the ranking was closer to a preferential treatment, so he did not receive promotions along his good performances. He won the equivalent of four consecutive tournaments. His wrestling is said to have been cautious and subdued. On the occasion of Matthew C. Perry's visit to Japan, he had an opportunity to display his wrestling prowess in a tournament Perry and his military advisors attended.

Yokozuna
As a yokozuna he was not known for his performance but rather his generosity, holding exhibition shows in his hometown and donating the proceeds to shrines, including a torii gate and lanterns. More than 10,000 spectators gathered, making the events the most successful since the founding of Yanagawa, Fukuoka. In the top makuuchi division, he won 127 bouts and lost 32 bouts, recording a winning percentage of 79.9.

Retirement from sumo
He retired in February 1865 and took the name Oitekaze. He later led the Edo Sumo Association as its chairman, and he acquired a reputation for honesty. He continued to gift temples and notably gave their gates to the Ekō-in temple and the Asakusa Shrine. It is said that it was under his mandate that the first three yokozuna in history (Akashi Shiganosuke, Ayagawa Gorōji and Maruyama Gondazaemon) began to be considered as official wrestlers and no longer as myths of which we did not really know if they had existed. He died on June 15, 1890.

Yokozuna in-ring ceremony

The name of one style of yokozuna dohyō-iri (the yokozuna ring-entering ceremony) came from him. His ritual dance was said to be beautiful but it isn't proven that he performed the ritual movements in the Unryū-style. His style is said to have been imitated by Tachiyama Mineemon but Tachiyama's style is called Shiranui-style now and Unryū is credited with inventing the Shiranui-style. The common theory is that the names of the Unryū and Shiranui styles were switched. This was due to sumo scholar Kozo Hikoyama, who without researching properly, labelled Tachiyama's style as being that of Shiranui Kōemon, whereas it was in fact created by Unryū. Hikoyama was such an authority that no one contradicted him, and the Shiranui name has stuck. Some believe that the Unryū and Shiranui ring-entering ceremonies were so beautiful that only the names were retained in later generations and that the names were switched because they were not thoroughly investigated when the style were officially named.
It has been determined in later years from nishiki-e and photographs, what styles Unryū and Shiranui actually performed with evidence like a nishiki-e of Unryū performing a yokozuna ring-entering with his arms extended just like the Shiranui-style and a photograph of Shiranui posing in the Unryū-style.

Top division record 
The actual time the tournaments were held during the year in this period often varied.

  
    
    
  
  
    
    
  
  
    
    
  
  
    
    
  
  
    
    
  
  
    
    
  
  
    
    
  
  
    
    
  
  
    
    
  
  
    
    
  
  
    
    
  
  
    
    
  
  
    
    
  
  
    
  

*Championships for the best record in a tournament were not recognized or awarded before the 1909 summer tournament and the above unofficial championships are historically conferred. For more information see yūshō.

See also

List of yokozuna
List of past sumo wrestlers
Glossary of sumo terms

References

1822 births
1890 deaths
Japanese sumo wrestlers
Yokozuna
People from Yanagawa, Fukuoka
Sumo people from Fukuoka Prefecture
19th-century wrestlers